Maura McHugh is an Irish author of horror and fantasy in prose, comic books, plays, and screenplays.

Early life
Born in the US, McHugh moved to Ireland as a child. She was educated in the National University of Ireland in Galway where she graduated with a B.A. in English and History, and then an M.A. in English. After living overseas for a while McHugh returned to Ireland and to education where she gained a Diploma in Film studies at NUIG, a Foundation Course in Filmmaking at the Galway Film Centre, and finally a second M.A. in Screenwriting at the Huston School of Film and Digital Media.

Career
Based in Galway, McHugh is the author of Roisin Dubh and Jennifer Wilde. She is also editor of the Writers Guild of Ireland fortnightly newsletter, as well as the guild's website and blog.

McHugh has been a regular judge for the Galway Junior Film Fleadh, the British Comic Awards, and Octocon's Golden Blasters, as well as having been a judge for The Shirley Jackson Awards. She also curated "The Image" during the Hay festival in Kells.  She was Guest of Honour at the 2015 Octocon (the Irish National Science Fiction Convention).

In 2018, she was invited to take part in an initiative of the Creative Europe project, a 10-day residency in Angoulême in France. Since 2018, she has worked on a number of Judge Anderson stories for Rebellion, including a novella published in 2020.

Awards

Won
 Recipient of the Gordon R. Dickson Scholarship for the 2006 Clarion West Writers Workshop, 2006.
 Best Irish Writer (comic books) in The Arcade Awards, 2014.
 ICN Award 2015 for ‘Best Irish Writer Published Outside of Ireland’, 2015.

Nominations
The Arcade Award in the ‘Best Irish Writer’ category, 2015
The Geekies 2015 – the Geek Ireland Awards – in the Best Irish Writer category, 2015
Geek Feminist Award in the Women Write About Comics Awesome Awards, 2014
British Fantasy Award for Best Comic/Graphic Novel for Jennifer Wilde(Atomic Diner Comics), along with Stephen Downey & Karen Mahoney, 2014
Two ICN Awards, 2014
Geek Ireland's Best Irish Author of 2014 (comic books), 2014
Eagle Award for ‘Favourite European Comic Book’ for Jennifer Wilde, 2012
ICN Award for ‘Best Irish Writer Published Outside of Ireland’ , 2013
The Arcade Award in the ‘Best Irish Writer’ category, 2013

Bibliography

Collections
Twisted Fairy Tales, Barron's Educational Series: 1 February 2013. Illustrations by Jane Laurie.
Twisted Myths , Barron's Educational Series: 1 October 2013. Illustrations by Jane Laurie.
The Boughs Withered (When I Told Them My Dreams),NewCon Press, August 2019.

Comic Books
Lola Vita – Origins, Drawn by Ron Salas, 2016.
Witchfinder: The Mysteries of Unland, story & script by Kim Newman & Maura McHugh; art by Tyler Crook for Dark Horse Comics, 2014-2015.
Jennifer Wilde: Tulpa, story & script by Maura McHugh; art by Leeann Hamilton for Atomic Diner Comics. Short Story, 2014.
 Róisín Dubh, story & script by Maura McHugh; art by Stephen Byrne and Stephen Daly, for Atomic Diner Comics, 2011 – 2014.
Jennifer Wilde: Unlikely Revolutionaries, story & script by Maura McHugh; art by Stephen Downey for Atomic Diner Comics, 2011 – 2013 .
The Nail, Womanthology comic book anthology, with art by Star St. Germain, edited by Suzannah Rowntree, and published by IDW Publishing,2012
Colours, Outside An Anthology of new horror fiction, with art by John Riordan, published by Topics Press and Ash Pure, 2017

 Anderson: Psi Division:
 "SPA Day" (with art by Emma Vieceli, in 2000 AD Summer Sci-Fi Special, June 2018)
 "The Dead Run" (with art by Patrick Goddard, in Judge Dredd Megazine #410-414, July - November 2019)
 "No Country for Old PSIs" (with art by Steven Austin, in Judge Dredd Megazine #424, September 2020)
 "All Will Be Judged" (with art by Anna Morozova, in 2000 AD Summer Sci-Fi Special, July 2021)
 "Be PSI-ing You" (with art by Lee Carter, in 2000 AD #2250, September 2021)
 "Dissolution (with art by Lee Carter, in Judge Dredd Megazine #445-447, June - August 2022)

 Judge Dredd:
 "Apotheosis" (with Michael Carroll, with art by James Newell, in 2000 AD Summer Sci-Fi Special, July 2021)

"King for a Day" (with art by Andreas Butzbach, in Smash! 2020 Special, published by Rebellion, May 2020)
"The Thief of Senses" (with art by Robin Henley, in Misty & Scream! 2020 Special, published by Rebellion, October 2020)
"Teddy Scar" (with art by Steve May, in Monster Fun, published by Rebellion, October 2021)

Non Fiction
A Midnight Movie Monograph, Twin Peaks: Fire Walk With Me, published by Electric DreamHouse Press, 2017
Under the Influence: Kneale’s Dramatic Legacy, We Are The Martians: The Legacy of Nigel Kneale anthology, published by PS Publishing, 2017

Novellas
Judges: Psyche, Abaddon Books, 2020.

Short Stories
Who Hears Our Cries in Forgotten Tongues?, Flash Me Magazine, 2004
In the Woods, Cabinet des Fées, Vol. 1, No. 1, 2006
Bone Mother, Fantasy anthology, eds. Sean Wallace & Paul Tremblay, 2007
Tattoo Destiny, a poem, Jabberwocky 3, ed. Sean Wallace, 2007
Home, Shroud Magazine, Issues 2, 2008
Homunculus, Aoife's Kiss, September 2008
Grave Taster, a poem, in Doorways Magazine #8. It placed second in the magazine's annual poetry competition, 2009
One pico story on Outshine, 2009
Exchange, a poem, Goblin Fruit, Spring 2009.
Vic, Black Static, issue 10. 2009 and  the Year's Best Dark Fantasy and Horror 2010, edited by Paula Guran (Prime Books), 2010
Beautiful Calamity, Paradox Magazine, issue #13, 2009
The Diet, Arkham Tales, 2009
The Garden of Death, a top ten finalist in Fantasy Magazine's Micro-Fiction Contest, 2009
The Tamga, Shroud Magazine, issue 6, 2009
Empty Mind Came Back With the Pearl, M-Brane SF, issue 9, 2009
The Secret Names of Buildings, M-Brane SF, issue 12, 2009*‘The Solace of Dark Places, a poem, Goblin Fruit, Spring 2010.
‘Involuntary Muscle, Theaker’s Quarterly Fiction, issue 35, 2011
Water, Black Static, issue 21, 2011
Mustn’t Grumble, Voices from the Past, 2011*The Hanging Tree, Black Static issue #38, 2014
Valerie in the anthology La Femme, edited by Ian Whates from NewCon Press and in Obsidian, 2014
Family in the anthology Cassilda’s Song, edited by Joe S. Pulver from Chaosium Inc, 2015
 A Decade of Horror Stories by Women, edited by Ian Whates from NewCon Press, 2016
Zel and Grets in the anthology The Grimm Future, edited by Erin Underwood from NESFA Press.
Moments on the Cliff’ Crannóg.
Listen Women in Horror Month Anthology, Acid Cane Comics.
The Light at the Centre, Uncertainties Volume 1, edited by Brian J. Showers for Swan River Press
The Fruit of the Tree, Ten Tall Tales, edited by Ian Whates for NewCon Press.
Spooky Girl, Respectable Horror, edited by Kate Laity for Fox Spirit Books.
A Rebellious House, The Madness of Dr. Caligari, edited by Joe S. Pulver for Fedogan and Bremer.

Plays, Films and Podcasts
29 October – 3 November 2012 ‘The Night-Born Sisters’, performed in the Leicester Square Theatre, London.
6 May 2016 The Love of Small Appliances, directed by Justine Nakase.
Bone Mother, Pseudopod, 2009
The Tamga,  Pseudopod, 2010
Vic  Dark fiction Magazine, 2011
Hotel Training, directed by Conor McMahon, premiered as part of the Hotel Darklight anthology film, 2009
Bone Mother is being adapted as a short stop-motion animated film by Sylvie Trouvé and Dale Hayward. Produced for the National Film Board of Canada by Jelena Popovic, 2016

References

Year of birth missing (living people)
Living people
21st-century Irish novelists
Writers from County Galway
Irish fantasy writers
Irish science fiction writers
Irish women short story writers
Irish horror writers
Women science fiction and fantasy writers
Women horror writers
Irish women novelists
21st-century Irish women writers
21st-century Irish short story writers